The natural hair movement is a movement which aims to encourage people of African descent to embrace their natural, afro-textured hair. It originated in the United States during the 1960s, with its most recent iteration occurring in the 2000s.

Definition and features
The movement centers around Black people who wear afro-textured hair in its natural, coiled, or tight, curly state.

These individuals of African descent choose not to relax their hair, allowing it, instead, to grow in its natural texture. To relax one's hair means to use chemicals to straighten it. This can be done professionally, or through a kit purchased at a grocery store for home use. Afro-textured hairstyles can vary and may include the adoption of hair twists, braids or even dreadlocks. Not all people that wear their hair naturally will choose to do without all (non-chemical) forms of straightening or styling. Additionally, for many members of the movement, "being natural" does not necessarily indicate a strict adherence to any particular type of product or styling regimen; nor is it exclusively tied to certain social or political beliefs.

The word nappy, historically used as a derogatory term to describe the hair of Black people, has been positively reappropriated by Afrodescendants. In Francophone countries, nappy is often used as a portmanteau of 'natural' and 'happy'. In the past, the word was subject to denigration, having origins that stretch back to the Atlantic slave trade. It is surmised that nappy may have originated as a pejorative reference to the frizzy texture of cotton picked by Black slaves.

History

In the ancestral traditions, hairdressing was "an activity during which the genealogies' history and many other cultural features were taught to children. Every African hairdressing was codified according to the ethnic group and by status."

During the Atlantic slave trade, the conditions of servitude did not allow black people to take care of their hair, as these people were subjected to denigration by their master: 'Nappy' became a pejorative term. The deportation of millions of Africans made them separate from their originally aesthetic activities regarding hair care.

After the American abolition of slavery in 1865, black populations looked to straighten their hair, so as to move closer to the dominant aesthetics in an effort to get hired. At the time, the most used instrument for hair smoothing was the hot comb, before Garrett A. Morgan invented a relaxer cream in 1909.

In the period between the 1960s–1970s, racial segregation reigned between blacks and whites in the United States. Angela Davis, a young human rights activist and member of the revolutionary movement Black Panthers created in 1966, made the Afro hairstyle famous. This dense and spherical hairdressing thus symbolized the emancipation and cultural affirmation of African Americans. It was adopted by many stars, like Diana Ross and the Jackson 5 band members.

During the 1970s–1980s, popularized especially by some celebrities, the "Jheri curl," a newer technique to loosen tightly curled hair, became fashionable in the African American community. It can even be seen on Michael Jackson's hair in the music video of his song Thriller.

During these same years, dreadlocks (naturally matted hair locks) were also introduced into popular culture and popularized through reggae music, especially by Bob Marley's hair style and by the Rastafarian movement. This hairstyle can be a mark of social and spiritual distinction: "The adoption of long or very atypical hair [can reflect] rebellion or a refusal of the dominant values."

Hair straightening was considered mainstream and performed frequently throughout the 1980s and 1990s.

The return to natural hair in the organic era has been encouraged by the awareness of the harmful effects of relaxers on the scalp, ranging from itchiness, red patches, and burns to alopecia.

The natural hair movement today
For about ten years, because of Web 2.0, a growing number of people have been sharing their beauty advice via:

Blogs: Black Girl Long Hair, Naturally Curly, Curly Nikki, Hair Lista, Afrobella, Un-ruly.com in the US; Black Beauty Bag, Afrobelle, Ivy-Mag in France
Web-zines: Naturally Happy Hair in the US; FashizBlack, Afrosomething in France; Afro Style Magazine in the Netherlands

These websites have expanded the natural hair movement around the world so as to highlight the beauty of natural hair.

Each woman has her own reason to retrieve her authenticity; some of them want to preserve their hair against aggressive hair styling methods such as weaves being too tight or harmful straightening chemical products. Other women simply prefer their natural hair in spite of the pressure from the dominant aesthetics.

The natural hair movement has been encouraged by some stars who have abandoned straightening, allowing their natural hair to make a comeback such as Erykah Badu, Lupita Nyong'o, Solange Knowles,  Janelle Monáe, and Viola Davis.

In 2014 The Curly Girl Collective held their first CurlFest, a now annual festival held in Brooklyn, NY that celebrates natural hair. Outside the US, several events have developed in order to accompany the natural hair movement, particularly in France and in Africa:
The salon Boucles d'ébène: A demonstration, has existed for ten years, dedicated to the black hairdressing and beauty.
The Miss Nappy Paris′ competition: The election of "Miss Nappy" so as to promote the Afro hair beauty.
The Massalia Nappy Days: Lectures, projections of documentaries and fashion shows.
The Crépue d'ébène Festival at Abidjan (Ivory Coast): Dedicated to the natural beauty of the African woman and to the highlighting of the nappy hair.
The Natural Hair Academy: Event to better understand the nappy hair, days of advice by speakers.
The AfricaParis Festival: Dedicated to the "Afropean" culture.

On 3 July 2019, California became the first US state to prohibit discrimination over natural hair. Governor Gavin Newsom signed the CROWN Act into law, banning employers and schools from discriminating against hairstyles such as afros, braids, twists, and dreadlocks. Likewise, later in 2019 Assembly Bill 07797 became law in New York state; it "prohibits race discrimination based on natural hair or hairstyles."

"Ethnic" hair care industry
With the popularity of "going natural", hair care suppliers have seen a rapid decrease in the purchase of relaxers, the harsh chemical hair straightener. An industry that was once worth an estimated $774 million, relaxer sales have gone down 26% over the last five years, 2013 numbers report. Relaxer sales have fallen to 38% between 2012 and 2017. Sales are estimated to decrease to 45% by 2019.

Women who wear their hair natural are now spending more money on chemical-free products that bring out the best result for their hair in its natural state. Hair care suppliers and markets are taking note, as Black consumers represent a lucrative market for hair care suppliers, so the brands now have to adjust for the new hair movement. Brands have greatly lowered their production of relaxers and instead now produce more natural-friendly products. In choosing what products to consume, black consumers rely heavily on social media to measure results from others who have gone natural. They have done this by the use of YouTube videos as tutorials on how to use products efficiently, and create reviews for potential consumers to watch. Popular brands and products include Shea Moisture, DevaCurl, and Carol's Daughter.

Objections and opposition
Many women of African descent have faced opposition from wearing their hair in naturally curly styles or other non-straight, protective styles.

Many women have found that they are treated unjustly based on having naturally afro-textured hair. Natural hair can be deemed as "unprofessional", turning it into a fireable offense. For example, a 12-year-old student at a Florida Christian school with natural hair "was given one week to decide whether to cut her hair or leave the academy that she has attended since third grade" after she complained to school officials about being bullied by other students. In March 2014, the United States Department of Defense issued a set of guidelines that banned all afros, dreadlocks, braids, and twists that were greater than " in diameter. Guidelines such as these clearly disproportionately affect and target those of African descent. They later rolled back the guidelines that same year in August by allowing two-strand twists. The Army increased the size of permissible braids and removed the word "unkempt" from their guidelines. In April 2016, a female Zara employee in the Canadian city of Toronto was reprimanded for wearing her hair in a braided hairstyle, which resulted in her filing a complaint with the Ontario Human Rights Commission.

Hair appropriation/cultural appropriation has been an issue within the natural hair community. Many non-women of color, especially celebrities, often wear African-American hairstyles, which some have found offensive. Giuliana Rancic apologized to actress Zendaya—who wore dreadlocks on the 2015 Oscar's red carpet—after commenting that Zendaya's hair must have smelled of "patchouli oil or weed".

Kim Kardashian wore Fulani braids (originating from the Fulani tribe of West Africa) on three different occasions, without acknowledging the origin of these braids. She referred to them as 'Bo Derek' braids' after Bo Derek, an actress from the 1980s who wore Fulani braids in the 1979 film 10. Kardashian received backlash, especially from the black community, but did not acknowledge the response. The idea of non-black women wearing natural hair styles remains controversial.

Terminology

Several words are frequently used in the vocabulary of the natural hair movement:

 Afro: A hairstyle created by combing the hair away from the scalp, allowing the hair to extend out from the head in a large, rounded-shape, much like a cloud or ball.
 Bantu knot: Hairstyle that consists of twisted hair rolled up into small buns. See Jada Pinkett Smith as Niobe in The Matrix series.
 Big chop: Cutting one's chemically straightened hair to let it grow in its natural texture.
 Braids: Hairstyle where hair is braided with extensions or with natural hair.
 Box braids: A form of protective styling done through braiding synthetic hair along with real hair. This promotes hair growth and protects hair from breakage and other damaging factors.
 Braid out: Braids are unraveled.
 Creamy crack: Chemical relaxers. The term was coined with the thought that the use of relaxers is addictive for those women who strive for a permanently straight hair texture.
 Coils: A hairstyle achieved by taking small sections of wet or very damp hair and smoothing, while rotating the sections, one by one, from root to tip. Tiny styling combs or a finger are typically used. 
 Coily: The texture characteristic of natural Type 4 hair, whereby the configuration of the strand resembles a small-diameter ink pen spring.
 Cornrows: A style of braiding/plaiting hair into narrow strips to form geometric patterns on the scalp. A form of protective styling.
 Co-wash: Washing one's hair with conditioner instead of shampoo.
 Detangling: The process of using fingers or a wide-tooth comb to get out knots in curly textured hair.
 Dreadlocks: Matted or sculpted ropes of hair.
 Fro-hawk: Hairdressing similar to the mohawk hairstyle.
 Hair porosity: Natural hair can have low, high, or medium porosity. Low porosity hair cuticles are very tightly closed and don't absorb water or product easily. High porosity hair cuticles are very open and absorb water and product easily. Medium porosity is more balance and absorbs water, product, and moisture easily. In order to best treat naturally curly hair, celebrity hairstylist Andre Walker created a hair typing system. This categorizes hair into four categories based on how tight curls are coiled.
 Kinky hair: Tightly curled hair, tightly coiled hair or hair without defined curls.
 Protective hairstyle: Any coiffure configuration that keeps hair ends safely tucked away to keep the natural hair protected from the elements. These hairdos require very little daily upkeep and help strands stay moisturized. Includes braids, extensions, wigs, and weaves. See Janet Jackson in Poetic Justice.
 Senegalese twists: Also known as rope twists where synthetic hair is used and twisted in with the natural hair.
 Shrinkage: Because natural hair is typically has different types of curls and textures, in its natural state it appears shorter than it would straightened.
 Transition: Period of time when one is transitioning from straightening their hair with heat/and or chemical products to wearing hair in its natural state.
 TWA (Teeny Weeny Afro): Short Afro haircut. See Viola Davis in the film Suicide Squad.
 Twist out: Hairstyle where twists are unraveled. See Corinne Bailey Rae.
 Twists: Double strands of hair wrapped around each other.
 Wash and go: wash one's hair and going on about one's day. This means there is no drying or styling involved and the application of product is minimal (usually a moisturizer or anti-frizz serum). The wash and go is also sometimes referred to as the "shake and go" which further emphasizes the lack of actual styling involved. The goal of a wash and go is to define natural curls.

Filmography

Nappily Ever After, movie directed by Haifaa Al-Mansour in 2018.
 Good Hair, movie directed by Jeff Stilson and produced by Chris Rock in 2009.
 My Nappy Roots: A Journey Through Black Hair-itage, movie directed and produced by Regina Kimbell in 2008.
 Hair Love, Oscar-winning short, created by Matthew A. Cherry

See also

Afro
Afro-textured hair
Afrocentrism
Black is beautiful
Discrimination based on hair texture
Black Panthers
Black feminism
Blaxploitation
Curly Girl Method
Internalized racism
Nappturality
Postcolonialism
List of hairstyles

References

Bibliography
Aliona L. Gibson, Nappy: Growing Up Black and Female in America, Writers and Readers Ltd, 1 July 2000
Juliette Sméralda, Peau noire, cheveu crépu : l'histoire d'une aliénation, Jasor, 2004
Frantz Fanon, Peau noire, masques blancs, Seuil, 1952
Willie Lee Morrow, 400 Years Without a Comb, Morrow's Unlimited Inc., 1973
Ebony, Natural hair – new symbol of race pride, Johnson Publishing Company, December 1967
Audrey Davis-Sivasothy, The Science of Black Hair: A Comprehensive Guide to Textured Hair, SAJA Publishing Company, 11/04/2014

External links

 

African-American culture
African-American hair